= Hing Cheung So =

Hing Cheung So from the City University of Hong Kong was named Fellow of the Institute of Electrical and Electronics Engineers (IEEE) in 2015 for contributions to spectral analysis and source localization.
